The College Football Playoff National Championship Trophy is the trophy awarded to the winner of the College Football Playoff (CFP), the postseason tournament in American college football that determines a national champion for the NCAA Division I Football Bowl Subdivision (FBS). It is currently held by the Georgia Bulldogs, who won the 2022 College Football Playoff National Championship to cap the 2021 season.
The ,  trophy is oblong-shaped like a football at the base, tapering up to a flattened full-size football at the top. It is made of 24-karat gold, bronze and stainless steel, with the bulk of the trophy gold-colored and the football at the top a gray metallic color. The football's four laces represent the four playoff teams.

The trophy is separate from its 12-inch-tall bronze base, so it can be hoisted. The base is finished in black patina and weighs . Dr Pepper sponsors the trophy, paying an estimated $35 million for the sponsorship rights through 2020. The trophy was unveiled on July 14, 2014.

The trophy was designed by design firm Pentagram and crafted by the Polich Tallix fine art foundry of Rock Tavern, New York.

College Football Playoff officials commissioned the trophy for the new playoff system, preferring a new award that was unconnected with the previous Bowl Championship Series (BCS) postseason system which was sometimes controversial. Winners of the BCS National Championship Game were awarded the AFCA "crystal football" trophy through the 2013 season.

Winners

By team

See also
AFCA National Championship Trophy
AP National Championship Trophy
Grantland Rice Trophy
MacArthur Bowl
College football national championships in NCAA Division I FBS

References

College football championship trophies